Ludovic Graugnard (born 25 October 1977) is a French football manager who manages both the Tahiti national team and the Tahiti national under-17 team.
Marie à Candice Graugnard né Coronel
2 filles Garance et Isaure

References

1977 births
Living people
French football managers
Tahiti national football team managers
People from Arles
Sportspeople from Bouches-du-Rhône

Toulouse Football Club